Heliotropium hirsutissimum, the hairy heliotrope, is a species of flowering plant in the family Boraginaceae, native to the eastern Mediterranean; Greece (including Crete), Turkey (including the European portion), Cyprus, the Levant, Egypt, and Libya. It contains a number of pyrrolizidine alkaloids. Grauer is listed as the authority by some sources.

References

hirsutissimum
Flora of Greece
Flora of Crete
Flora of the East Aegean Islands
Flora of European Turkey
Flora of Cyprus
Flora of Lebanon
Flora of Syria
Flora of Palestine (region)
Flora of Egypt
Flora of Libya
Plants described in 1784